The United States Air Force's 111th Space Operations Squadron (111 SOPS) is an Air National Guard space communications unit located at Sky Harbor International Airport, Arizona. 111 SOPS is the military's first unit to operate free-floating balloons in the near space environment.

Previous designations
 111th Space Operations Squadron (2003 – present)
 Det 2, Arizona Air National Guard (???)

Bases stationed
Sky Harbor International Airport, Arizona (2003 – present)

Equipment Operated
Combat SkySat balloons (2003 – present)

References

External links
 Arizona Air National Guard

Squadrons of the United States Air National Guard
Military units and formations in Arizona
Space Operations 0111